José Teles de Souza (born 22 April 1971 in Teresina, Piauí) is a Brazilian long-distance runner. He finished eighteenth in the marathon at the 2007 World Championships.

Achievements

Personal bests
10,000 metres - 28:46.6 min (1997)
Half marathon - 1:04:33 hrs
Marathon - 2:13:25 hrs (1999)

References

sports-reference

1971 births
Living people
Brazilian male long-distance runners
Athletes (track and field) at the 2008 Summer Olympics
Olympic athletes of Brazil
Sportspeople from Piauí